Elizabeth Scott may refer to:

Elizabeth Scott (author) (born 1972), American novelist
Elizabeth Scott (hymnwriter) (1708-1776), English, American hymnwriter
Elizabeth Scott (mathematician) (1917–1988), American mathematician
Elizabeth Scott (swimmer) (fl. 1990s), American Paralympic swimmer
Elizabeth Scott (poet) 17 July 1729 – 1789), Scottish poet
Elizabeth Scott (politician) (born 1966), member of the Washington House of Representatives, 2013–2017
Elizabeth Talford Scott (1916–2011), American folk artist
Elizabeth Scott (textile manufacturer), (died 1795) Scottish organiser of weaving

See also
Elisabeth Scott (1898–1972), British architect
Lizabeth Scott (1922–2015), American actress
Elisabeth Alden Stam (née Scott), missionary murdered in 1934, see Murder of John and Betty Stam